Antarashen; formerly known as Gazanabutsakan petakan tntesutyane kits (translates as "Animal-farm state housing"), is a village in the Lori Province of Armenia.

References

Populated places in Lori Province